David Cowan may refer to:

David Cowan (cricketer) (born 1964), Scottish cricketer
David Cowan (entrepreneur), U.S. venture capitalist and entrepreneur 
David Cowan (footballer, born 1982), English footballer
David Cowan (footballer, born 1910), Scottish footballer
David Cowan (politician) (1742–1808), Scottish naval officer and politician in Upper Canada
David Tennant Cowan (1896–1983), British Indian Army officer

See also
David Cowan Dobson (1893–1980), Scottish portrait artist
Dave Cowens (born 1948), American basketball player